Differentiable programming is a programming paradigm in which a numeric computer program can be differentiated throughout via automatic differentiation.
 This allows for gradient-based optimization of parameters in the program, often via gradient descent, as well as other learning approaches that are based on higher order derivative information. Differentiable programming has found use in a wide variety of areas, particularly scientific computing and artificial intelligence. One of the early proposals to adopt such a framework in a systematic fashion to improve upon learning algorithms was made by the Advanced Concepts Team at the European Space Agency in early 2016.

Approaches
Most differentiable programming frameworks work by constructing a graph containing the control flow and data structures in the program. Attempts generally fall into two groups:

  Static, compiled graph-based approaches such as TensorFlow, Theano, and MXNet. They tend to allow for good compiler optimization and easier scaling to large systems, but their static nature limits interactivity and the types of programs that can be created easily (e.g. those involving loops or recursion), as well as making it harder for users to reason effectively about their programs. A proof of concept compiler toolchain called Myia uses a subset of Python as a front end and supports higher-order functions, recursion, and higher-order derivatives.

 Operator overloading, dynamic graph based approaches such as PyTorch and AutoGrad. Their dynamic and interactive nature lets most programs be written and reasoned about more easily. However, they lead to interpreter overhead (particularly when composing many small operations), poorer scalability, and reduced benefit from compiler optimization. A package for the Julia programming language Zygote works directly on Julia's intermediate representation, allowing it to still be optimized by Julia's just-in-time compiler.

A limitation of earlier approaches is that they are only able to differentiate code written in a suitable manner for the framework, limiting their interoperability with other programs. Newer approaches resolve this issue by constructing the graph from the language's syntax or IR, allowing arbitrary code to be differentiated.

Applications
Differentiable programming has been applied in areas such as combining deep learning with physics engines in robotics, solving electronic structure problems with differentiable density functional theory, differentiable ray tracing, image processing, and probabilistic programming.

See also
 Differentiable function
 Machine learning

Notes

References

Differential calculus
Programming paradigms